Eugenio Sánchez López (born 10 March 1999) is a Spanish cyclist, who currently rides for UCI ProTeam .

Major results
2017
 1st Overall 
1st Stage 1
2019
 1st Overall 
1st Stage 3
2021
 1st Overall

References

External links

1999 births
Living people
Spanish male cyclists
Sportspeople from Albacete